Marshall Nicholas Rosenbluth (5 February 1927 – 28 September 2003) was an American plasma physicist and member of the National Academy of Sciences, and member of the American Philosophical Society. In 1997 he was awarded the National Medal of Science for discoveries in controlled thermonuclear fusion, contributions to plasma physics, and work in computational statistical mechanics.  He was also a recipient of the E.O. Lawrence Prize (1964), the Albert Einstein Award (1967), the James Clerk Maxwell Prize for Plasma Physics (1976), the Enrico Fermi Award (1985), and the Hannes Alfvén Prize (2002).

Key scientific contributions
During his first post-doctoral position at Stanford University (1949–1950), he derived the Rosenbluth formula, which was the basis of the analysis used by Robert Hofstadter in his Nobel prize-winning experimental investigation of electron scattering.  Hofstadter refers to this in his 1961 Nobel Lecture: "This behavior can be understood in terms of the theoretical scattering law developed by M. Rosenbluth in 1950".

In 1953, Rosenbluth derived the Metropolis algorithm, based on generating a Markov chain which sampled fluid configurations according to the Boltzmann distribution. This algorithm was first presented in the paper "Equation of State Calculations by Fast Computing Machines", coauthored with his wife Arianna Rosenbluth (who wrote the first computer program to implement the method), Nicholas Metropolis, Augusta H. Teller and Edward Teller. This now-famous paper was cited in Computing in Science and Engineering as being among the top 10 algorithms having the "greatest influence on the development and practice of science and engineering in the 20th century." He and Arianna subsequently introduced the configurational-bias Monte Carlo method for simulating polymers.

By the late 1950s, Rosenbluth turned his attention to the burgeoning discipline of plasma physics and quickly laid the foundation for many avenues of research in the field, particularly the theory of plasma instabilities. Although he continued to work on plasma physics for the remainder of his career, he often made forays into other fields.  For example, around 1980, he and coworkers produced a detailed analysis of the free electron laser, indicating how its spectral intensity can be optimized.  He maintained a high productivity rate throughout his entire career.  Indeed, only a few years before his death, Rosenbluth discovered the existence of residual flows (so-called Rosenbluth-Hinton flows), a key result for understanding turbulence in tokamaks.

Early years
Rosenbluth was born into a Jewish family and graduated from Stuyvesant High School in 1942.  He did his undergraduate study at Harvard, graduating in 1946 (B.S., Phi Beta Kappa), despite also serving in the U.S. Navy (1944–46) during this period.  He received his Ph.D. in 1949 from the University of Chicago with Enrico Fermi.  In 1950, Edward Teller, considered the father of the hydrogen bomb, recruited Rosenbluth to work at Los Alamos. Rosenbluth maintained this position until 1956. The research he conducted at Los Alamos led to the development of the H-bomb.

Additional information
Upon his retirement, he took on the responsibility of chief scientist of the Central Team for the International Thermonuclear Experimental Reactor (ITER) until 1999.  Rosenbluth also served as a member of the JASON Defense Advisory Group.

Rosenbluth was affectionately known as the Pope of Plasma Physics in reference to his deep understanding of the field.

Notes

References
 J.W. Van Dam (Ed), From Particles to Plasmas: Lectures Honoring Marshall N. Rosenbluth, Addison Wesley (1989) .

External links
1994 Audio Interview with Marshall Rosenbluth by Richard Rhodes Voices of the Manhattan Project
University of Texas Memorial Text
Marshall N. Rosenbluth Papers MSS 670. Special Collections & Archives, UC San Diego Library.
Rosenbluth Award

1927 births
2003 deaths
American nuclear physicists
Enrico Fermi Award recipients
Harvard University alumni
Institute for Advanced Study faculty
Jewish American physicists
American people of German-Jewish descent
Members of the United States National Academy of Sciences
Monte Carlo methodologists
National Medal of Science laureates
Princeton University faculty
University of Chicago alumni
Stanford University faculty
Stuyvesant High School alumni
University of California, San Diego faculty
Members of JASON (advisory group)
American plasma physicists
Scientists from New York (state)
Fellows of the American Physical Society
20th-century American Jews
21st-century American Jews
Members of the American Philosophical Society